Waipawa was a parliamentary electorate in the Hawke's Bay Region of New Zealand, from 1881 to 1946.

Population centres
The previous electoral redistribution was undertaken in 1875 for the 1875–1876 election. In the six years since, New Zealand's European population had increased by 65%. In the 1881 electoral redistribution, the House of Representatives increased the number of European representatives to 91 (up from 84 since the 1875–76 election). The number of Māori electorates was held at four. The House further decided that electorates should not have more than one representative, which led to 35 new electorates being formed, including Waipawa, and two electorates that had previously been abolished to be recreated. This necessitated a major disruption to existing boundaries.

The legislation defined the area as follows:

This district is bounded towards the North by the Hawke's Bay Electoral District; towards the East by the sea; towards the South by the Waimata Stream to its source; thence by a right line to Trig. Station No. 41a; thence by a right line to Trig. Station on Whahatuaro; then by the Manawatu River to the Manawatu Gorge; thence towards the West by lines from peak to peak along the summit of the Ruahine Range to the Hawke's Bay Electoral District,

History

William Cowper Smith was the first representative. From  to 1890 Smith represented the Woodville electorate, which only existed for those three years.

The representative for Waipawa for the period from 1887 to 1890 was Thomas Tanner; he retired at the end of the parliamentary term.

The  was won by Hunter, who continued to represent the electorate until 1930.

D. B. Kent was originally announced as an independent Liberal-Labour candidate. He was then approached by the United Party and became their official candidate. The local supporters of the United Party had not been consulted on this, and did not support Kent, but backed Ernest Albert Goodger instead. Goodger thus stood as an independent United candidate. This split the United Party vote, but Hunter again won with an absolute majority.

Jull in turn defeated Christie in 1938, but he died on 24 September 1940. He served until the end of the parliamentary term in 1946, when the electorate was abolished.

Members of Parliament
The electorate was represented by seven Members of Parliament:

Key

Election results

1943 election

1940 by-election

1938 election

1935 election

1931 election

1930 by-election

1928 election

1925 election

1922 election

1919 election

1914 election

1911 election

1908 election

1905 election

1902 election

1899 election

1896 election

1893 election

1890 election

1887 election

1884 election

1881 election

Table footnotes

Notes

References

Historical electorates of New Zealand
Politics of the Hawke's Bay Region
1881 establishments in New Zealand
1946 disestablishments in New Zealand